Ivan Tucakov (born 1978 in Belgrade) is a producer, composer and author currently living in Vancouver, British Columbia, Canada.

Life
Tucakov, of Serbo-Croatian descent, spent the first eight years of his childhood in the plains of central Turkey, then moved to live in Serbia. He has travelled extensively around the world gaining exposure to various cultures, exploring the techniques of Balkan Music, Afro-Cuban jazz, Flamenco, Indian Classical Music, Cuban music, Persian Music, Fado, Roma music, and others.

Tucakov also graduated with an honours degree in Computer Science and Physics at the University of British Columbia, which led him down the path of authoring a number of books that explore novel ways of understanding the world.

Musical Projects
- In 2004, Tucakov formed the Tambura Rasa collective.

- In 2012 Ivan Tucakov and the classical pianist Oriana White created a world fusion duet called "Vino & Forte", classical on one side and Balkan-flamenco on the other.

Authored Works
- Mindful Connection Method (2010)

- Cultura Rasa (2019)

Discography

Sunrise on a New World (2004)

Featuring: Delhi 2 Dublin's Tarun Nayar on tablas; Thomas Tumbach on violin.

 Cinnabar
 Plamen
 Funky Bedouin
 Isla Mujeres / Yuandao (featuring Chris Suen on Diao and Xia)
 El Gharbi (featuring Aboubacar Camara - African singing)
 Anadol
 Hey Mister
 Ningchen (featuring Chris Suen on Diao and Xia)
 Makumba (featuring Aboubacar Camara - African singing)
 Nada

Viaje (2006)
Featuring: Delhi 2 Dublin's Tarun Nayar on tablas.

 Anadol (featuring Brian Poulsen on solo guitar)
 Jovano Jovanke
 Delirio (featuring David Sorroche with Flamenco singing)
 Viaje (featuring Victor Chorobik on duduk and flutes)
 TJango (featuring Dugg Schmidt on Bandoneon)
 Ghazal (featuring Aditya Verma on Sarod)
 Likeadazeickle (featuring Brian Poulsen on solo guitar)
 Dulces Suenos (featuring Luis Gutierrez - Flamenco singing)
 Mausim (featuring Victor Chorobik on duduk and flutes and Chris Suen on guzheng)
 Party Song (featuring Brian Poulsen on solo guitar)

Kamanala (2008)

 Gypsy Love (featuring Joseph 'Pepe' Danza on Percussion and Flute)
 Tambura Pana
 Bandido
 Loved One
 Ceo Svet (featuring Anupam Shobhakar on the Sarod)
 Mujeres
 Akşam (featuring Anupam Shobhakar on the Sarod)
 Cintamani
 Estrella (featuring Joseph 'Pepe' Danza on Percussion)
 Hang On (featuring producer Chin Injeti - vocals)

Tambura Rasa Beats (2009)

A lounge electronica compilation of some of Tambura Rasa world fusion compositions from 2005-2009 (Includes Cafe del Mar's releases: Cinnabar Mix and Gypsy Love Mix). Tambura Rasa Beats was nominated for the Western Canadian Music Award 2010 World Recording of the Year.

 Cinnabar Mix (Café del Mar XIII Mix)
 Tambura Pana (Latin Dub Mix)
 Isla Mujeres (Bossa Lounge Mix)
 Mausim (Yoga Mix)
 Ningchen (Tranquil Morning Mix)
 Funky B (Desert Mirage Mix)
 Ghazal (Indian Chill Mix)
 Gypsy Love Mix (Café del Mar XVI Mix)

Adsum (2011)

Nominated for Western Canadian Music Awards 2011 Best World Recording. Featuring Michael Fraser on violin, Robin Layne on percussion, John Bews on bass, and Trevor Grant on drums.

 Ardor Kadife (Baladi Buleria)
 Miris Irisa
 Se Smej
 A Day With You
 Oh! Belka
 Vrcka
 Soledad
 Adsum
 Lamento de Amistad (Siguirilla)
 New World

In Concert (2012)

Nominated for Western Canadian Music Awards 2013 Best World Recording. Features the Black Dog String Quartet (Elyse Jacobson, Cameron Wilson, John Kastelic and Doug Gorkoff), Michael Fraser on violin, Colin Maskell on saxophone and flute, Kerry Galloway on bass, Elliot Polsky on drums, and Robin Layne on percussion.

 Isla Mujeres (Live)
 Türk Kahvesi (Live)
 Ardor Kadife (Live)
 Viaje (Live)
 Ceo Svet (Live)
 Loved One (Live)
 Bandido (Live)
 Miris Irisa (Live)
 Mujeres (Live)
 Lamento De Amistad (Live)
 Adsum (Live)
 Delirio (Live)
 Anadol (Live)

Arribada (2014)

Featuring the Black Dog String Quartet (Elyse Jacobson, Cameron Wilson, John Kastelic and Doug Gorkoff), Cameron Wilson on solo violin, Colin Maskell on bansuri, saxophone and flute, Kerry Galloway on bass, Randall Stoll on drums, and Robin Layne on percussion.

 Shine On You Crazy Diamond (featuring Neelamjit Dhillon on tablas) - Pink Floyd cover
 En la Vida (featuring Miguelito Valdez on vocals and trumpets)
 Nada (guest vocalist: Maria Avila) 
 Türk Kahvesi (guest vocalist: Michael Antonakos)
 Voz
 Dulces Sueños (featuring Neelamjit Dhillon on tablas)
 Ay Haiku (featuring Neelamjit Dhillon on tablas)
 El Viento (guest vocalist: David Sorroche)
 Arribada

Infinite ∞ (2021)

Featuring Ivan Tucakov on vocals and guitar, Emily Helsdon on violin, Soroush Shahres on viola, Oriana White on piano, Langston Raymond on trumpet, Robin Layne on percussion, JeanSe Le Doujet on bass & Randall Stoll on drums 

Side A
 Animae Īra 4:30
 A Way 5:29
 Told Ya! 4:37
 Crystal Glass 3:29

Side B
 Lemniscātus Anantya 4:02
 Yume San 2:38
 Dreams 5:09
 Rêverie 5:52

Compilation Albums
 2006 - "Cinnabar Mix" - Café del Mar Vol. 13. Tucakov's electronic mix of his song "Cinnabar" (from the first CD "Sunrise on a New World") was released on this compilation.
 2009 - "Gypsy Love Mix" - Café del Mar Vol. 16. Tucakov's electronic mix of his song "Gypsy Love" (from the third CD "Kamanala") was released on this compilation.

Soundtracks
 2004 - Golden Rush (documentary)
 2005 - On the Bag (documentary)
 2006 - Heartfelt Cafe (short movie)

Authored Works

Mindful Connection Method (2010)

A Practical Guide Toward Cultivating Nurturing Relationships

In 2010 Ivan Tucakov released a book on social dynamics called The Mindful Connection Method, offering guidance in areas of personal growth, family dynamics, work settings, conflict resolution, counseling, education, community building, and social issues. In 2013, he released The Compass Within workbook, suggesting practical steps to breaking destructive, disconnecting habit loops and replacing them with restorative, connecting habits.

Tucakov maintains an active blog on related topics, runs discussion practice workshops and educational seminars, and offers private coaching through his organization, "The Compass Within".

Cultura Rasa (2019)

The Emergence and Replicative Nature of Socio-Cultural Societies

In 2019, after five years of study and research, Ivan Tucakov returns with a volume that explores the emergence and replicative nature of socio-cultural societies. 

Cultura Rasa presents an integrated picture of all animal cultures, built from the bottom-up: starting from the world of atomic matter, over biological systems that they create, which further emerge into neural networks that ultimately build cultural systems. Cultura Rasa presents a dozen original hypotheses within the disciplines of science and philosophy, whilst also proposing a preliminary structure of the tree of culture. 

Ivan’s intent with this primer is to create accuracy and consistency in concept definition, to offer a deeper understanding and tolerance of varying cultural worldviews.

References

External links
 Ivan Tucakov Official web site
 Tambura Rasa Official web site
 Tambura Rasa YouTube page
 Vino & Forte Official web site
 Vino & Forte YouTube page
 Cultura Rasa Official web site

Musicians from Belgrade
1978 births
Living people